Mahmoud Mestiri (25 December 1929 in Tunis – 28 June 2006) was a Tunisian diplomat and politician, who served as the minister of foreign affairs from 1987 to 1988. He was serving as the ambassador of Tunisia when he was appointed to the post. In both posts he replaced Hédi Mabrouk. Mestiri was former president of the Tunisian football team Club Africain.

References

1929 births
2006 deaths
People from Tunis
Foreign ministers of Tunisia
Ambassadors of Tunisia to France
20th-century diplomats